The 2014–15 Syracuse Orange men's basketball team represented Syracuse University during the 2014–15 NCAA Division I men's basketball season. The Orange were led by thirty-ninth-year head coach Jim Boeheim and played their home games at the Carrier Dome in Syracuse, New York. They were second-year members of the Atlantic Coast Conference (ACC).

The Orange did not participate in the 2014–2015 postseason. The team self-imposed a postseason ban as a response to an ongoing NCAA investigation into potential past infractions by the team. Syracuse University initiated the case, which includes academics, when it self-reported potential athletic department violations to the NCAA in 2007. School officials said that none of the conduct occurred after 2012, and no current student-athlete is involved. The ban included the NCAA tournament, ACC tournament and NIT.

Preseason

Departures

Recruits

Preseason outlook

Roster

Schedule

|-
!colspan=12 style="background:#FF6F00; color:#212B6D;"| Exhibition

|-
!colspan=12 style="background:#FF6F00; color:#212B6D;"| Regular season

|-
!colspan=12 style="background:#; color:white;"| ACC regular season

Rankings

2015–16 Recruiting

References

Syracuse Orange men's basketball seasons
Syracuse
Syracuse Orange men's b
Syracuse Orange men's b